Sergio Gómez may refer to:

Sergio Gómez (singer) (1973–2007), Mexican singer
Sergio Gómez (footballer, born 1981), Argentine football manager and former midfielder
Sergio Gómez (footballer, born 1991), Spanish football defensive midfielder
Sergio Gómez (footballer, born 2000), Spanish football offensive midfielder

See also
Sérgio Gomes (born 1969), Brazilian football striker
Sergi Gómez (born 1992), Spanish football centre back